Igor Vujačić (born 8 August 1994) is a Montenegrin professional footballer who plays as a defender for Partizan and the Montenegro national team.

Club career
Vujačić made his first-team debut for Zeta in September 2011. He totaled 12 appearances and scored once during the 2011–12 season. In February 2013, Vujačić was transferred to Serbian club Vojvodina on a four-year contract. He, however, failed to make an impact and was released at the beginning of the following year. In April 2014, Vujačić joined Polish club Widzew Łódź and was immediately assigned to the reserve team.

After returning to his homeland, Vujačić signed with Mogren in the summer of 2014. He spent just half a season at Stadion Lugovi before rejoining his parent club Zeta. Over the following four and a half years, Vujačić established himself as one of the best defenders in the league, amassing 133 appearances and scoring nine goals.

In June 2019, Vujačić signed with Serbian club Partizan and was given the number 5 shirt. Vujačić made the Partizan debut on his 25th birthday, after he came on as a sub during the 3rd round UEFA Europa League qualifier against Yeni Malatyaspor. In his first season, Vujačić mostly came into the game from the bench, he played only 12 competitive games.

Just one month after the start of the new season, Aleksandar Stanojević became the new coach of Partizan and Igor slowly became a regular first team player. He scored his first goal on 21 February 2021 in a 3-0 home win against Radnik Surdulica. One week later Vujačić scored his second goal in a 6-0 away win against Inđija.

On 12 August 2021 Vujačić played a big role in a return match of the UEFA Europa Conference League Third qualifying round against Sochi when he kicked the ball off the goal line in the 103rd minute of extra time and later during the penalty shootout he scored a fourth penalty that took Partizan to Play-off round. In the first game of the Play-off round, Vujačić scored a goal in a 2-1 loss against Santa Clara. In the 54th minute, Vujačić reduces the advantage of the Portuguese. A great action by Partizan started by Natcho from the free kick, the ball came to Šćekić who headed it to the other side to Vujacić. He headed the ball into the net and made the final score 2-1.

International career
Vujačić represented his country at under-19 and under-21 level. He made his full international debut for Montenegro on 7 June 2019, playing the full 90 minutes in a 1–1 draw with Kosovo.

Notes

References

External links

 
 
 
 
 

1994 births
Living people
Footballers from Podgorica
Association football central defenders
Montenegrin footballers
Montenegro youth international footballers
Montenegro under-21 international footballers
Montenegro international footballers
FK Zeta players
FK Vojvodina players
Widzew Łódź players
FK Mogren players
FK Partizan players
Montenegrin First League players
Serbian SuperLiga players
Montenegrin expatriate footballers
Expatriate footballers in Serbia
Montenegrin expatriate sportspeople in Serbia
Expatriate footballers in Poland
Montenegrin expatriate sportspeople in Poland